Boží Dar is a town in Karlovy Vary District in the Karlovy Vary Region of the Czech Republic. It has about 200 inhabitants.

Administrative parts
Villages of Ryžovna and Zlatý Kopec are administrative parts of Boží Dar.

Geography

The municipality lies in the Ore Mountains. The area around the Božídarský Špičák with peat bogs is protected as the Božídarské rašeliniště National Nature Reserve.

The Černá creek flows across the municipal territory. The Myslivny Reservoir is supplied by the creek.

History
The remote area in the Saxon Barony of Schwarzenberg was settled after silver and tin mining began about 1517. Boží Dar, under its original German name Gottesgab (both literally meaning "Gift of God"), was founded as a mining town by decree of the Wettin elector John Frederick I of Saxony, who acquired the lordship in 1533. Together with neighbouring Horní Blatná, John Frederick had to cede the town to the Habsburg lands of the Bohemian Crown in 1547 after the Schmalkaldic War and his defeat in the Battle of Mühlberg.

The peak of mining dates back to the 1550s and 1560s, when the town had over 2,000 inhabitants. In 1580, Emperor Rudolf II. promoted Boží Dar to the royal mining town. During the Thirty Years' War, the town was looted several times. In 1643, it was plundered by the Swedes. After the decline of mining in the 17th and 18th centuries, the original important mining town gradually turned into a mountain town, whose inhabitants subsisted on various domestic productions.

After World War I, Boží Dar became part of the First Czechoslovak Republic. It was mainly settled by Sudeten Germans and was one of the municipalities in Sudetenland annexed during the German occupation of Czechoslovakia in 1938. After World War II the German population was expelled. The historic town privileges were lost in the 1950s, but restored in 2006.

Demographics

Transport
Boží Dar is the site of a road border crossing to Oberwiesenthal in Saxony.

Sport
Boží Dar lies in one of the most important winter sport regions in the Czech Republic.The town is known for two ski resorts with several downhill runs and four ski lifts.

Notable people
Kaspar Eberhard (1523–1575), Lutheran theologian; local pastor in 1554
Nikos Kazantzakis (1883–1957), Greek writer; spent several months in Myslivny in 1929–1932
Lukáš Bauer (born 1977), cross country skier; lives here

References

External links

Populated places in Karlovy Vary District
Cities and towns in the Czech Republic
Towns in the Ore Mountains